Anne Walton (born 28 December 1951) is a Canadian former backstroke swimmer. She competed in three events at the 1968 Summer Olympics.

References

External links
 

1951 births
Living people
Canadian female backstroke swimmers
Olympic swimmers of Canada
Swimmers at the 1968 Summer Olympics
People from Sidmouth
Sportspeople from Devon